Henry James Sedgwick (June 5, 1812 – June 14, 1868) was an American lawyer and politician who served as a member of the New York State Senate for the 7th district from 1845 to 1847.

Early life and education
He was the son of Stephen Sedgwick (1783–1830), a lawyer who practiced for a short time in Ithaca, and Anna (Baldwin) Sedgwick (1786–1872). They divorced in 1818, and Anna married Daniel Gott (1794–1864), who was a Congressman from 1847 to 1851.

Career 
Sedgwick was a member of the New York State Senate for the 7th district from 1845 to 1847, sitting in the 68th, 69th and 70th New York State Legislatures. He later served as the postmaster of Syracuse, New York.

Personal life 
In 1834, Henry J. Sedgwick married Lucinda Snow (d. 1855), and they had three children. In March 1856, he married Lucy Hubbard. Congressman Charles B. Sedgwick (1815–1883) was his brother. He was buried at the Oakwood Cemetery

Sources
The New York Civil List compiled by Franklin Benjamin Hough (pages 135f and 145; Weed, Parsons and Co., 1858)
Post Office Directory (1857; pg. 117)
Hyde Genealogy by Reuben H. Walworth (1863; pg. 339f)

External links

1812 births
1868 deaths
Politicians from Ithaca, New York
Politicians from Syracuse, New York
Democratic Party New York (state) state senators
New York (state) postmasters
Burials at Oakwood Cemetery (Syracuse, New York)
19th-century American politicians
Lawyers from Syracuse, New York
19th-century American lawyers